Étoile Sportive du Sahel is a Tunisian professional basketball club from Sousse. The club competes in the Tunisian Division I Basketball League. Notable former players of the team include senior men's Tunisian national basketball team members Makrem Ben Romdhane, Amine Rzig, Salah Mejri. Sahel has won one FIBA Africa Champions Cup, in 2011.

Honors

Domestic leagues
Championnat National A 
Champions (6): 1980–81, 2006–07, 2008–09, 2010–11, 2011–12, 2012–13
Runners-up (3): 2013–14, 2015–16, 2016–17
Tunisian Cup 
Champions (5): 1981, 2011, 2012, 2013, 2016
Runners-up (3): 1980, 1982, 2010
Championnat National B 
Champions (1): 2021–22
Tunisian Men's Basketball Super Cup 
Runners-up (1): 2014
Tunisian Basketball Federation Cup 
Runners-up (1): 2017

Continental leagues
FIBA Africa Clubs Champions Cup 
Champions (1): 2011
Runners-up (2): 2008, 2013 
Arab Club Championship
Champions (2): 2015, 2016
Houssem Eddine Hariri Tournament 
Runners-up (3): 2012, 2015, 2016

Presidents

References

External links
AfricaBasket.com Team Page
ESS on Instagram

Basketball teams in Tunisia